"Flag Day" is the debut single released by British indie rock band The Housemartins. Released in 1985, it peaked at #124 on the UK Singles Chart, and a re-recorded version of it appeared on the debut album London 0 Hull 4. "Flag Day" also appears on the compilations Now That's What I Call Quite Good, Soup and as a shorter live version on Live at the BBC.

The song was also sampled and used heavily on the dance track "Change the World" by Dino Lenny.

Track listing
7"
"Flag Day" / "Stand at Ease"

12"
"Flag Day" / "You" / "Stand at Ease" / "Coal Train to Hatfield Main"

References

The Housemartins songs
1985 debut singles
1985 songs
Go! Discs singles
Songs written by Paul Heaton
Songs written by Stan Cullimore